Eliodoro Camacho is a province in the La Paz Department in Bolivia situated at Lake Titicaca. Its seat is Puerto Acosta.

Camacho Province is situated in the western region of the La Paz Department bordered to the north by the Muñecas Province, to the east by the Larecaja Province, to the south by the Omasuyos Province, to the west by Lake Titicaca and Moho Province located in the Puno Region of Peru.

Camacho Province was created during the presidency of General Ismael Montes on November 5, 1908, named after the Bolivian politician and officer Eliodoro Camacho. Originally it was composed of the cantons Huaycho, Escoma, Carabuco, Italaque, Mocomoco and Ambaná. Huaycho became the capital of the province under the name "Puerto Acosta" (meaning: "Port Acosta") in honor of the writer Nicolás Acosta (1844 - 1893).

Subdivision 
The province is divided into five municipalities  which are further subdivided into cantons.

See also 
 Qachu Quta
 Uma Jalsu

External links 
 Map of the Eliodoro Camacho Province

References 

Provinces of La Paz Department (Bolivia)